Waldemar Mordechai Wolff Haffkine  (15 March 1860 Odessa – 26 October 1930 Lausanne) was a Russian-French bacteriologist known for his pioneering work in vaccines.

Born into a Jewish family in Odessa, Russian Empire, Haffkin was educated at the University of Odessa and later emigrated first to Switzerland, then to France, working at the Pasteur Institute in Paris, where he developed a cholera vaccine that he tried out successfully in India. He is recognized as the first microbiologist who developed and used vaccines against cholera and bubonic plague. He tested the vaccines on himself. Lord Joseph Lister named him "a saviour of humanity".

He was appointed Companion of the Order of the Indian Empire (CIE) in Queen Victoria's 1897 Diamond Jubilee Honours. The Jewish Chronicle of that time noted "a Ukraine Jew, trained in the schools of European science, saves the lives of Hindus and Mohammedans and is decorated by the descendant of William the Conqueror and Alfred the Great."

In his final years Haffkine became more religious, becoming an advocate and philanthropist for Orthodox Jewish causes and a supporter of Zionism.

Early years
Born Vladimir Aaronovich Mordecai Wolf Chavkin, the fourth of five children of Aaron and Rosalie (daughter of David-Aïsic Landsberg) in a family of a Jewish schoolmaster in Berdyansk, Russian Empire (now Ukraine), he received his education at the gymnasium of Berdyansk Odessa, and St. Petersburg.

Young Haffkine was also a member of the Jewish League for Self-Defense in Odessa. Haffkine was injured while defending a Jewish home during a pogrom.  As a result of this action he was arrested but later released due to the intervention of biologist Ilya Mechnikov.

Haffkine continued his studies from 1879 to 1883 with Mechnikov at Odesa University, but after the assassination of Tsar Alexander II, the government increasingly cracked down on people it considered suspicious, including intelligentsia. Haffkine graduated with a Doctor of Science at the age of 23. Haffkine was also employed by the zoological museum at Odessa from 1882 to 1888. Debarred from professorship, as a Jew, in 1888, Haffkine was allowed to emigrate to Switzerland and began his work at the University of Geneva, as an assistant professor of Physiology. In 1889 he joined Mechnikov and Louis Pasteur in Paris at the newly established Pasteur Institute where he took up the only available post of librarian.

Protozoological studies
Haffkine began his scientific career as a protozoologist and protistologist, under the tutelage of Ilya Mechnikov at Imperial Novorossiya University in Odessa and later at the Pasteur Institute in Paris. His early research was on protists such as Astasia, Euglena, and Paramecium, as well as the earliest studies on Holospora, a bacterial parasite of Paramecium. In the early 1890s, Haffkine shifted his attention to studies in practical bacteriology.

The euglenid genus Khawkinea is named in honor of Haffkine's early studies of euglenids, first published in French journals with the author name translated from Cyrillic as "Mardochée-Woldemar Khawkine".

Anti-cholera vaccine

At the time, one of the five great cholera pandemics of the 19th century ravaged Asia and Europe. Even though Robert Koch discovered Vibrio cholerae in 1883, the medical science at that time did not consider it a sole cause of the disease. This view was supported by experiments by several biologists, notably Jaume Ferran i Clua in Spain.

Haffkine focused his research on developing a cholera vaccine, and produced an attenuated form of the bacterium. Risking his own life, on 18 July 1892, Haffkine performed the first human test on himself and reported his findings on 30 July to the Biological Society. Even though his discovery caused an enthusiastic stir in the press, it was not widely accepted by his senior colleagues, including both Mechnikov and Pasteur, nor by European official medical establishment in France, Germany and Russia.

Haffkine considered India, where hundreds of thousands died from ongoing epidemics, as the best place to test his vaccine. Through the influence of the Marquis of Dufferin and Ava, who was in Paris as the British Ambassador, he was allowed to demonstrate his ideas in England. He proceeded to India in 1893 and established a laboratory at Byculla in 1896, which moved to Parel and was later called the Haffkine Institute. Haffkine worked on the plague and by 1902–03 half a million were inoculated but on 30 October 1902, 19 people died from tetanus out of 107 inoculated at Mulkowal. This "Mulkowal disaster" led to an enquiry. He was briefly suspended but reappointed director of the Biological Laboratory in Calcutta. He retired in 1915 and suffering from malaria, had to return to France.

Anti-plague vaccine
"Unlike tetanus or diphtheria, which were quickly neutralized by effective vaccines by the 1920s, the immunological aspects of bubonic plague proved to be much more daunting." In October 1896, an epidemic of bubonic plague struck Bombay and the government asked Haffkine to help. He embarked upon the development of a vaccine in a makeshift laboratory in a corridor of Grant Medical College. In three months of persistent work (one of his assistants experienced a nervous breakdown; two others quit), a form for human trials was ready and on 10 January 1897 Haffkine tested it on himself. "Haffkine's vaccine used a small amount of the bacteria to produce an immune reaction." After these results were announced to the authorities, volunteers at the Byculla jail were inoculated and survived the epidemics, while seven inmates of the control group died.  "Like others of these early vaccines, the Haffkine formulation had nasty side effects, and did not provide complete protection, though it was said to have reduced risk by up to 50 percent."

Despite Haffkine's successes,  some officials still primarily insisted on methods based on sanitarianism: washing homes by fire hose with lime, herding affected and suspected persons into camps and hospitals, and restricting travel.

Even though official Russia was still unsympathetic to his research,  Haffkine's Russian colleagues, doctors V. K. Vysokovich and D. K. Zabolotny, visited him in Bombay.  During the 1898 cholera outbreak in the Russian Empire, the vaccine called "лимфа Хавкина" ("limfa Havkina", Havkin's lymph) saved thousands of lives across the empire.

By the turn of the 20th century, the number of inoculees in India alone reached four million and Haffkine was appointed the Director of the Plague Laboratory in Bombay (now called Haffkine Institute). In 1900, he was awarded the Cameron Prize for Therapeutics of the University of Edinburgh.

Haffkine was the first to prepare a vaccine for human prophylaxis by killing virulent culture by heat at 60 °C. The major limit of his vaccine was the lack of activity against pulmonary forms of plague.

Connection with Zionism
In 1898, Haffkine approached Aga Khan III with an offer for Sultan Abdul Hamid II to resettle Jews in Palestine, then a province of the Ottoman Empire: the effort "could be progressively undertaken in the Holy Land", "the land would be obtained by purchase from the Sultan's subjects", "the capital was to be provided by wealthier members of the Jewish community", but the plan was rejected.

Little Dreyfus affair
In March 1902, nineteen Indian villagers from Mulkowal in Punjab (inoculated from a single bottle of vaccine) died of tetanus, whilst the other 88 villagers were well. Evidence pointed to the contamination of one bottle - 53N. The procedure for sterilisation at the Parel lab had been changed from carbolic acid to sterilisation using heating, a process that had been used at the Pasteur Institute safely for two years but was new in the British Empire. The 1903 commission from the Indian government concluded this was the source of the contamination.

An inquiry commission indicted Haffkine, and he was relieved of his position and returned to England. The report was unofficially known as the "Little Dreyfus affair", as a reminder of Haffkine's Jewish background and religion. 

The Lister Institute reinvestigated the claim and overruled the verdict: it was discovered that an assistant used a dirty bottle cap without sterilizing it.

In July 1907, a letter published in The Times called the case against Haffkine "distinctly disproven". It was signed by Ronald Ross, 
William R. Smith, and Simon Flexner, among other medical dignitaries. This led to Haffkine's acquittal.

Late years

Since Haffkine's post in Bombay was already occupied, he moved to Calcutta and worked there until his retirement in 1914.  Haffkine returned to France and later moved to Lausanne, Switzerland, where he spent the last years of his life.

Haffkine received numerous honors and awards. In 1925, the Plague Laboratory in Bombay was renamed the Haffkine Institute. In commemoration of the centennial of his birth, Haffkine Park was planted in Israel in the 1960s.

Orthodox Judaism
In a biography of him, Nobelist Selman Abraham Waksman explains that, in this last phase of his life, Haffkine had become a deeply religious man. Haffkine returned to Orthodox Jewish practice and wrote A Plea for Orthodoxy (1916). In this article, he advocated traditional religious observance and decried the lack of such observance among "enlightened" Jews, and stressed the importance of community life, stating:

In 1929, he established the Haffkine Foundation to foster Jewish education in Eastern Europe. Haffkine was also respectful of other religions, and "he considered it of the utmost importance to promote the study of the Bible."

In 1982, the Chabad Hasidic movement published three letters addressed to Haffkine by the sixth Lubavitcher Rebbe, Rabbi Yosef Yitzchak Schneersohn, who had engaged Haffkine to support the Jews living in communist Russia.

References

Sources
Edinger, Henry.  "The Lonely Odyssey of W.M.W. Haffkine", In Jewish Life Volume 41, No. 2 (Spring 1974).
Waksman, Selman A. The Brilliant and Tragic Life of W.M.W. Haffkine: Bacteriologist, Rutgers University Press (1964).
 Hanhart, Joel. Lausanne University, Faculté de biologie et médecine. Haffkine, une esquisse: biographie intellectuelle et analytique de Waldemar Mordekhaï Haffkine 2013
 Prix de thèse 2014 – Société des Etudes Juives Societe des Etudes Juives societedesetudesjuives.org, accessed 11 December 2020
 
 Hanhart, Joel. "Waldemar Mordekhaï Haffkine (1860–1930)". Biographie intellectuelle, Éditions Honoré Champion (2016), .
 Hanhart, Joel. "Un illustre inconnu. Une biographie du docteur" Waldemar Mordekhaï Haffkine, Éditions Lichma (2017), .
 Markish, David. Mahatma. The Savior Mankind Never Knew (Translated by Marian Schwartz). Mahatma Haffkine Foundation, Aleksandr Duel, New-York, 2019.

Notes

External links

 
 Haffkine Research Institute
 Waldemar Haffkine: Pioneer of Cholera vaccine at American Society for Microbiology
 Plague Vaccine Design at Food and Drug Administration (FDA)
 Biography at Jewishgen
 The Holy Scientist at windsofchange.net
 Great scientist, great Jew, Rabbi M. Friedman at cjnews.com
The Last Resort: The Man Who Saved the World from Two Pandemics, Udi Edery at the National library of Israel
Waldemar Haffkine: The vaccine pioneer the world forgot, Joel Gunter and Vikas Pandey at the BBC.Com

1860 births
1930 deaths
Jewish microbiologists
Bacteriologists
Microbiologists from the Russian Empire
Jews from the Russian Empire
Emigrants from the Russian Empire to Switzerland
Odesa Jews
Companions of the Order of the Indian Empire
Inventors from the Russian Empire
Baalei teshuva
Physicians from the Russian Empire
Jewish British scientists
British Orthodox Jews
Odesa University alumni
Physicians from Odesa
Jewish physicians
Emigrants from the Russian Empire to France
Emigrants from the Russian Empire to India
Expatriates from the Russian Empire in India
Ukrainian expatriates in India
British people of Ukrainian-Jewish descent
Naturalised citizens of the United Kingdom